DreamWorks Records (often referred in copyright notices as SKG Music, LLC) was an American record label founded in 1996 by David Geffen, Steven Spielberg and Jeffrey Katzenberg as a subsidiary of DreamWorks Pictures. The label operated until 2003 when it was sold to Universal Music Group. The label itself also featured a Nashville, Tennessee-based subsidiary, DreamWorks Nashville, which specialized in country music and was shut down in 2006. The company's logo was designed by Roy Lichtenstein and was his last commission before his death in 1997.

History 
In October 1994, four years after David Geffen sold his former record label Geffen Records to MCA Music Entertainment, he joined Steven Spielberg and Jeffrey Katzenberg to form DreamWorks SKG. SKG stood for Spielberg, Katzenberg & Geffen. The three partners later launched the subsidiary record label DreamWorks Records in early 1996. Rufus Wainwright was the first artist to be signed to the new record label, in early 1996.

The logo for the label was the last project completed by artist Roy Lichtenstein. The distinctive design, incorporating a musical note in the artist's trademark "dream balloon," debuted on the packaging for Beautiful Freak, the first album from Los Angeles-based band Eels, and the second release from the record company. The record label's first release, George Michael's Older album, had featured DreamWorks Pictures' logo of a boy fishing and sitting on a moon crescent.

Henry Rollins (both as a spoken-word artist and with Rollins Band), Tamar Braxton, Nelly Furtado, George Michael, Randy Newman, Morphine, Eels, comedian/actor Chris Rock, Powerman 5000, Elliott Smith, Papa Roach and others were also signed to the label. The label was presided over by Lenny Waronker and Mo Ostin, who had run Warner Bros. Records until the mid-1990s. Ostin stated at the time: "What you find in the record business is there is more and more a trend toward corporate control, corporate values, and here you’re dealing with a creatively oriented operation."

Geffen Records distributed DreamWorks Records until 1999, when Interscope Records took over distribution duties (meanwhile, as Interscope and Geffen switched international distribution to Polydor Records, DreamWorks Records followed suit). It was announced on November 11, 2003, that Universal Music Group (the former MCA Music Entertainment, and parent of Interscope, Geffen, and Polydor) reached an agreement to acquire DreamWorks Records from DreamWorks for "about $100 million". The purchase came at a time when the music business was "going through major changes" as it struggled to "counter falling sales and the impact of unofficial online music sales". Mo Ostin, the principal executive at DreamWorks Records, said: "Despite the challenges of the music business today, Universal is acquiring a wonderful asset and the sale will assure the strongest possible future for our artists". Under the new deal, DreamWorks Records was placed within the Interscope Geffen A&M label, under the direction of Jimmy Iovine. After DreamWorks was folded into Geffen Records, Jordan Schur was joined by Polly Anthony in 2004.

Its country music division, DreamWorks Nashville, which began in June 1997, remained operational until January 29, 2006, when it was shut down by Universal Music Group Nashville.

DreamWorks Nashville 
Between 1997 and 2006, DreamWorks also operated a division in Nashville, Tennessee for country music acts. Among the artists signed to the DreamWorks Nashville division were Jessica Andrews, Emerson Drive, Toby Keith, Mike Walker, Randy Travis, Jimmy Wayne, and Darryl Worley. After DreamWorks Records' dissolution, former executive Scott Borchetta formed Big Machine Records in late 2005, signing several country music acts to the label. Borchetta also signed Show Dog Records in partnership with Toby Keith, although Keith dropped his association with the latter label in 2006. Meanwhile, Borchetta signed Taylor Swift to DreamWorks Records. The latter label merged with Universal South Records to become Show Dog-Universal Music.

See also 
 DreamWorks Records discography
 List of DreamWorks Records artists
 List of record labels

References

External links 
 

DreamWorks Pictures
Record labels based in California
Defunct record labels of the United States
American country music record labels
American record labels
Pop record labels
Soundtrack record labels
Record labels established in 1996
1996 establishments in California
Defunct companies based in Greater Los Angeles
Labels distributed by Universal Music Group
Record labels disestablished in 2006
2006 disestablishments in California
David Geffen
Steven Spielberg
Jeffrey Katzenberg